Rickettsia monacensis is a tick-borne (Ixodes ricinus and Ixodes nipponensis) spotted fever group Rickettsia species.

References

Further reading
Baldridge, Gerald D., et al. "Transposon insertion reveals pRM, a plasmid of Rickettsia monacensis." Applied and Environmental Microbiology 73.15 (2007): 4984–4995.

Jado, Isabel, et al. "Rickettsia monacensis and human disease, Spain."Emerging infectious diseases 13.9 (2007): 1405.

External links
LPSN

Rickettsiaceae
Bacteria described in 2002